Typh Barrow is a Belgian singer, songwriter, jurist, composer and pianist who was born in Brussels, Belgium. Her style is a mixture of pop and soul music with jazz and blues accents.

She is considered by the press to be the Belgian Adele or Amy Winehouse.

Her mother tongue is French. She is also fluent in English, Spanish and Dutch.

Beginnings 
She began piano at age five, scales at eight, and wrote one of her first songs at twelve. At fourteen she started taking singing lessons.

She learnt live performing in numerous piano bars and met the person who would become her producer and manager, François Leboutte. He had her record her first demos before launching her in the profession.

At the end of 2012 she released her first single, Your Turn, which was warmly received by Belgian radio stations and was the most played song in the French speaking part of Belgium in 2013.

When the moment came to release her first EP, she lost her voice during a live show, due to a vocal fold cyst. She had to remain silent for several months to avoid the necessity of an operation which might make her lose her voice tone. She had no choice but to cancel all her engagements.

Success 
In 2013 she started posting piano-voice covers on YouTube, which quickly achieved millions of views. Her cover of "Gangsta's Paradise" was noticed by the rapper Coolio, its original interpreter, who called it the best cover of his hit.

In 2014 she released two EPs. First was Time, which contained original songs and recorded in Paris, London and New York in collaboration with (Tom Coyne, Volodia…). And Visions, a cover EP she offers to her internet followers.

Among her most famous tracks are "Time", "To Say Goodbye", and "No Diggity". All of these tracks made the best radio charts and the double EP spent several weeks in the official charts.

Thanks to these songs, she was invited to appear on numerous TV shows and to give numerous concerts across Europe and at festivals such as Les Francofolies de Spa, the Brussels Summer Festival and the Festival de Cannes.

In 2015 the RTBF music show D6bels on Stage dedicated a special edition to her and the news broadcast of the same channel mentioned her among the favourites of the Francofolies de Spa's 2015 edition.

In 2016 she went to London to record her next album in Abbey Road studios, which has preserved the equipment used in the 1960s. She notably worked with Dimitri Tikovoï, Danton Supple and with the funk, jazz, hip-hop and soul collective The Heliocentrics. The Whispers, the first single from these recordings, was released in March 2016.

In January 2017 she was nominated for the D6bels Music Awards in the categories "Female Artist of the Year" and "Artist Classic 21", and she released a new song,  Daddy's Not Coming Back.

On 13 October 2019, Typh Barrow was among various artists (including Yannick Noah, Christophe Maé, Black M, and James Blunt) to perform at RTBF's Cap48 event, (a fundraising event held mainly to help those with disabilities in the Wallonia-Brussels and German communities of Belgium).  The event aired live on RTBF.

Discography

Studio albums

EPs

Singles

References

External links 
 

Living people
Belgian soul singers
Belgian women singer-songwriters
French-language singers of Belgium
Belgian jazz singers
Musicians from Brussels
21st-century Belgian women singers
21st-century Belgian singers
1987 births